|}

The Prix de Ris-Orangis is a Group 3 flat horse race in France open to thoroughbreds aged three years or older. It is run at Maisons-Laffitte over a distance of 1,200 metres (about 6 furlongs), and it is scheduled to take place each year in July.

History
The event was established in 1970, and it was initially called the Prix d'Évry. It was named after a new racecourse under construction at Évry. The first running was held at Saint-Cloud. It was originally a 1,600-metre race for horses aged four or older, and it took place in early spring.

The Prix d'Évry was transferred to Maisons-Laffitte and given Group 3 status in 1971.

The race moved to Évry when the venue opened in 1973. At this point it was renamed after Ris-Orangis, a commune in which part of the racecourse was situated.

The Prix de Ris-Orangis was cut to 1,200 metres, switched to July and opened to three-year-olds in 1987. It was transferred to Deauville in 1997.

The race was staged at Maisons-Laffitte in 2006. It returned to Deauville in 2007, moved back to Maisons-Laffitte in 2009 and was run at Deauville again in 2013 and 2014 before returning to Maisons-Laffitte in 2015.

Records
Most successful horse (3 wins):
 El Rastro – 1974, 1975, 1976

Leading jockey (4 wins):
 Yves Saint-Martin – El Rastro (1974, 1975), Nadjar (1980), Naishakar (1984)

Leading trainer (4 wins):
 Angel Penna – Gift Card (1973), El Rastro (1974, 1975, 1976)
 Alain de Royer-Dupré – Naishakar (1984), Tiza (2007, 2009), War Artist (2010) 
 André Fabre – Wedding of the Sea (1992), Diffident (1995), Time Prisoner (2011), Lockwood (2012) 

Leading owner (5 wins):
 Godolphin –  Time Prisoner (2011), Lockwood (2012), Rosa Imperial (2017), Inns of Court (2018), Royal Crusade (2020)

Winners since 1978

Earlier winners

 1970: Prince Regent
 1971: Dictus
 1972: Etoile Lointaine
 1973: Gift Card
 1974: El Rastro
 1975: El Rastro
 1976: El Rastro
 1977: Mittainvilliers

See also
 List of French flat horse races
 Recurring sporting events established in 1970 – this race is included under its original title, Prix d'Évry.

References
 France Galop / Racing Post:

 france-galop.com – A Brief History: Prix de Ris-Orangis.
 galop.courses-france.com – Prix de Ris-Orangis – Palmarès depuis 1983.
 galopp-sieger.de – Prix de Ris-Orangis.
 horseracingintfed.com – International Federation of Horseracing Authorities – Prix de Ris-Orangis (2016).
 pedigreequery.com – Prix de Ris-Orangis.

Open sprint category horse races
Maisons-Laffitte Racecourse
Horse races in France
Recurring sporting events established in 1970
1970 establishments in France